Idiacanthus antrostomus, also known as the Pacific blackdragon or black sea dragon, is a species of barbeled dragonfishes noted for having ultrablack skin, similar to pigments like Vantablack.

The fish has tightly packed melanosomes allowing its skin to absorb 99.95% of light of wavelengths common in its habitat.

References

Stomiidae
Fish described in 1890
Taxa named by Charles Henry Gilbert